Mayer Dabi is a 1986 Bangladeshi drama film directed by Awkat Hossain. Starring Bulbul Ahmed, Selina, Rosy Afsari, Prabir Mitra, Black Anwar and others. The film earned Best Child Artist Award at the 11th Bangladesh National Film Awards.  It is one of the fewest Bangladeshi films made on mother alongside Mayer Kanna (1986), Mayer Morjada, Mayer Ashirbad (1993), Hangor Nodi Grenade (1997), Ammajan (1999), Matritto (2003) etc.

Cast 
 Bulbul Ahmed
 Selina
 Rosy Afsari
 Prabir Mitra
 Black Anwar

Music 
Subal Das has directed the music for the movie. The songs are penned by M A Malek. The songs are sung by Sabina Yasmin, Andrew Kishore, Runa Laila, Rathindranath Roy, Pranab Kumar and Nasreen Reza. 

"Dine Dine Khoka Amar" - Runa Laila
"Prothom Jedin Dekha Holo" - Sabina Yasmin
"Raate Amar Bodhua" - Sabina Yasmin and Andrew Kishore
"Notun Ek Othiti Esechhe Ghore" - Sabina Yasmin and Rathindranath Roy
N/A - Pranab Kumar and Nasreeb Reza

Rewards 
 11th National Film Awards
 Winner:  Best Child Artist - Kamrunnahar Azad Swapna

References

External links 
 

Films scored by Subal Das
Bengali-language Bangladeshi films
1986 films
Films directed by Awkat Hossain
1980s Bengali-language films